Michael Rueben Egan  (born 21 February 1948), a former union official and former Australian politician, served as Treasurer of New South Wales between 1995 and 2005. Egan served as the Chancellor of Macquarie University from 2008 until 2019 and currently sits on a number of government and non-government advisory boards.

Early years and background
Born in Sydney, Egan was educated at St Patrick's Catholic College,  and obtained his Bachelor of Arts from The University of Sydney.  He worked in the Australasian Meat Industry Employees Union as a Federal Research Officer (19691973) and was an Advisor to Les Johnson as Federal Minister for Housing and Construction and Federal Minister for Aboriginal Affairs (19731975).

Egan served as an Officer of the NSW State Pollution Control Commission (19761978). Subsequently, he was employed as a Senior Policy Advisor to Barrie Unsworth, initially when the latter was Minister for Transport and Minister for Health, and then when Unsworth was Premier of NSW (19841986).

Political career
Egan was elected to the New South Wales Legislative Assembly on 7 October 1978, representing the seat of Cronulla. Although re-elected on 19 August 1981, he was defeated in the election held on 5 March 1984. He successfully ran for election to the New South Wales Legislative Council on 24 September 1986. It was not until the Bob Carr-led Labor Party took power on 3 April 1995 that he became State Treasurer, Minister for Energy, and Minister for State Development. In a Ministerial reshuffle in November 1997, Bob Debus took over the Energy portfolio. Egan was also Minister for Gaming and Racing for one month during 2003 replacing Richard Face and succeeded by Grant McBride. Egan was eventually to become the longest serving Treasurer in New South Wales.

In the few years before he became Treasurer when Labor was in Opposition, Egan had been the Shadow Finance Minister. Even though then Opposition Leader Bob Carr was Shadow Treasurer, Egan became the informal Opposition counterpart to Liberal Treasurer Peter Collins when Collins was appointed Treasurer in 1993. It was Egan, not Carr, who debated Collins on economic matters in media appearances. Egan in effect, if not in name, acted as the real Shadow Treasurer. It was because of Egan's solid performance against Treasurer Collins that Carr, upon becoming Premier in 1995 with the ALP's victory at the State election, broke with convention in not appointing the Shadow Treasurer just prior to the election (which was Carr himself) as Treasurer and appointed Egan instead.

Another break in convention with Egan's appointment as Treasurer is that he was a member of the Upper House, the New South Wales Legislative Council as previous Treasurers had been from the Lower House, the Legislative Assembly. However, since all money bills had to be introduced first in the Lower House, the Legislative Assembly, Egan delivered the State Budgets of 1995 to 2004 in the Legislative Assembly despite not being a member of that house of Parliament.

Announcing his resignation on 18 January 2005, Egan stated that, "after 35 years of political combat, I think it's time for me to move on."

Career after politics
Appointed a member of the Council of Macquarie University in 2006, Egan was appointed as Chancellor in February 2008 and held this position until February 2019. Other community roles include Chairman of the Australia Day Council of New South Wales since 2006, Chairman of the Centenary Institute of Cancer Medicine and Cell Biology since 2005, a Governor of the Woolcock Institute of Medical Research since 2005, and a Director of the Maritime Services Board of New South Wales between 1984 and 1986.

In May 2008 Egan was appointed Chairman of Terria, and in 2009, he was appointed as the Chair of the Australian Fisheries Management Authority Commission.

During the 2015 New South Wales state election Egan supported the privatistion stance of the Liberal government and slammed the labor party on its Anti privatisation position.

References

 

|-

|-

|-

1948 births
Living people
Members of the New South Wales Legislative Assembly
Members of the New South Wales Legislative Council
Treasurers of New South Wales
Officers of the Order of Australia
People from the Sutherland Shire
Chancellors of Macquarie University
Australian Labor Party members of the Parliament of New South Wales
LGBT legislators in Australia
Gay politicians
21st-century Australian politicians